Marion Kreiner (born 4 May 1981 in Graz) is an Austrian snowboarder known for Parallel Giant Slalom. She won gold at the FIS Snowboarding World Championships 2009 for Parallel Giant Slalom. She earned a bronze medal at the 2010 Winter Olympics.

References 

Austrian female snowboarders
Olympic snowboarders of Austria
Snowboarders at the 2010 Winter Olympics
Snowboarders at the 2014 Winter Olympics
Sportspeople from Graz
1981 births
Living people
Olympic bronze medalists for Austria
Olympic medalists in snowboarding
Medalists at the 2010 Winter Olympics